SeeVolution is a real-time website analytic web service that shows a heatmap of a website, detailing where visitors are clicking, mouse moves and scrolls. The data is used to allow webmasters to see what areas of a website visitors are using.

History
SeeVolution was founded by Edo Cohen in 2010. The company began by offering its service for free to website owners. In 2011, the company introduced premium features but also kept their free platform.

In 2011, the company secured $530,000 in angel financing. They also passed the milestone of being installed on more than 2,500 websites. The investment brought their total funding from angel investors to $730,000. In order to keep up with the demand for the product, the company secured an additional round of angel funding in 2012.

Products and services
SeeVolution uses an X-ray tool to capture data about how users interact with different parts of a website. The data collected includes mouse clicks, data entries, and navigational information. The data is then used to create a heatmap which overlays on the webpage to show where visitors are moving their mouse, what they are clicking on, and how far they scroll on a specific page. It allows the user to see data real-time and also provides event notifications.

The product works by installing a simple JavaScript to the website that is being monitored. After logging in, a heatmap overlay will show on the site, showing both clicks and page scrolls.

See also
 Web analytics
 List of web analytics software

References

External links
 Official Website
 SeeVolution Review on Appvita
 SeeVolution feature in Smashing Magazine in 2010

Web analytics
Web software